Yoon Jin-seo (born Yoon Soo-kyung, August 5, 1983) is a South Korean actress. She rose to prominence for her performance as Lee Soo-ah in the 2003 thriller film Oldboy which earned her the Best New Actress Award at the 40th Baeksang Arts Awards. Yoon is also best known for her performances in The Moonlight of Seoul (2008) and The Royal Gambler (2016). She is set to star in the crime thriller Netflix drama series A Model Family (2022).

Career
Yoon has starred in films such as Oldboy, All for Love, A Good Day to Have an Affair, and Secret Love. She also appeared in a variety of TV series — historical drama The Return of Iljimae, action comedy The Fugitive: Plan B, and cable romantic comedy 12 Signs of Love.

Yoon was a contributing writer at Movieweek magazine, writing 11 articles over the period of 2010 to 2011 under the column 윤진서의 롤링 페이퍼 ("Yoon Jin-seo's Rolling Paper").

In November 2012, Yoon signed on to be exclusively managed by FNC Entertainment.

In January 2021, Yoon left FNC Entertainment and signed with new agency Big Picture Entertainment.

Personal life
Yoon adheres to a vegetarian diet for ethics and health reasons.

She dated baseball player Lee Taek-Keun who then played for LG Twins from 2009 to 2010.

In June 2012, Yoon was hospitalized following an alleged suicide attempt, which her agency denied, saying it had been an accidental overdose of cold medicine.

Yoon and her boyfriend had a private wedding sometime in 2017 after three years of dating. As of 2018, she stated that she will spend her free time in Jeju Island, enjoying surfing and spending time with her husband following their honeymoon.

Filmography

Film

Television series

Variety show

Music video

Discography

Awards and nominations

References

External links
 

South Korean film actresses
South Korean television actresses
1983 births
Living people
21st-century South Korean actresses
Seoul Institute of the Arts alumni
21st-century South Korean singers
21st-century South Korean women singers
Best New Actress Paeksang Arts Award (film) winners